"You Make Me Feel (Mighty Real)" is a 1978 song by American disco/R&B singer Sylvester. It was written by James Wirrick and Sylvester, and released as the second single from Sylvester's fourth album, Step II (1978). The song was already a largely popular dance club hit in late 1978, as the B-side of his previous single "Dance (Disco Heat)", before it was officially being released in December. Music critic Robert Christgau has said the song is "one of those surges of sustained, stylized energy that is disco's great gift to pop music".

In 2003, Q Magazine included "You Make Me Feel (Mighty Real)" in their list of the "1001 Best Songs Ever". In 2019, the song was selected by the Library of Congress for preservation in the National Recording Registry for being "culturally, historically, or aesthetically significant".

Origins
The song was originally recorded as a mid-tempo piano-driven gospel song; however, after producer Patrick Cowley saw a rehearsal of the song at San Francisco's City Club, he offered to remix the song. The result was one of the pioneering disco records using some electronic instrumentation and effects, following closely on "I Feel Love" by Donna Summer which heavily used electronic instrumentation ahead of its time. These 1970s songs using electronic instrumentation would have an influence on 1980s and 1990s dance music, which in turn, would have an influence on dance music in the next century.

Chart performance
The song was Sylvester's first Top 10 hit in the United Kingdom, where it peaked at #8 on the UK Singles Chart in October 1978. In Sylvester's home country, the single was his second Top 40 hit, peaking at #36 on the Billboard Hot 100 chart in February 1979. The song also reached #20 on the Billboard Hot Soul Singles chart. A 12" single was released in 1978, with "Dance (Disco Heat)" as the A-side and "You Make Me Feel (Mighty Real)" as the B-side, and these two extended dance mixes proved to be very popular in dance clubs at the time. The two songs held down the top spot on the Billboard Dance/Disco chart for six weeks in August and September 1978. These two songs helped to establish Sylvester's career as a noted disco and dance music performer, both in the US and abroad.

Impact and legacy
Q Magazine ranked "You Make Me Feel (Mighty Real)" number 677 in their list of the 1001 Best Songs Ever in 2003.

Pitchfork Media featured the song in their list of 50 Songs That Define the Last 50 Years of LGBTQ+ Pride in 2018.

In 2019, the song was selected by the Library of Congress for preservation in the National Recording Registry for being "culturally, historically, or aesthetically significant".

Daily Mirror listed "You Make Me Feel (Mighty Real)" at number 13 in their ranking of Top 50 Happiest Songs Ever in 2020.

Rolling Stone included it in their list of 500 Best Songs of All Time in 2021 at No. 399. In 2022, they placed it at No. 39 in their list of 200 Greatest Dance Songs of All Time.

Time Out ranked it number eight in their list of The 50 Best Gay Songs to Celebrate Pride All Year Long in 2022.

Charts

Weekly charts

Year-end charts

Jimmy Somerville version

British singer Jimmy Somerville, formerly of the bands Bronski Beat and Communards, released a cover of "You Make Me Feel (Mighty Real)" in 1989. His version of the song also received substantial club play, and it peaked at number 5 on the UK Singles Chart in January 1990. To date, this is the highest-charting version of the song in the UK. Somerville's cover of this song appears on his first solo album, Read My Lips.

Background
Somerville told in a 1990 interview with Billboard, that the track "was originally released during a period of time when the gay community was successful in creating positive visibility." He noted further, "And then AIDS created a political backlash. I wanted to bring this song forward as a means of picking up these pieces of history and contributing to bringing out a positive image of gay men." Having already covered two other 70's classics; "Don't Leave Me This Way" and "Never Can Say Goodbye", Somerville said he was trying to "reclaim what originally belonged to the gay community." He added, "During the '70s, we had all of these gay men expressing their emotions by writing music, and then using women vocalists as a front. We can now front these songs ourselves. It's an important thing to do. The problem is that so few people are willing to jeopardize record sales in order to be the honest and true people they really are."

Critical reception
Bill Coleman from Billboard described the song as a "unashamedly hi-NRG/pop cover". He noted that it marked Somerville's debut as a solo-singer. Pan-European magazine Music & Media wrote that the song is "an obvious choice for Somerville" and added further that he performs it with "such raw enthusiasm that his version is easily as good as the original. The basic difference is that the backing is tighter and cleaner-a punchy brass riff has been added and there is a video (that mixes fun and gay politics to good effect)." In his review of the song, David Giles from Music Week stated that the singer "makes a very fine job at it."

Music video
A music video was produced to promote the single, directed by Steve McLean. It features archive footage of Harvey Milk and Sylvester. The video was later published on YouTube in October 2017. It has amassed more than 4.4 million views as of September 2021.

Charts

Weekly charts

Year-end charts

Byron Stingily version

Chicago-born house music singer Byron Stingily, formerly of the band Ten City recorded a cover of "You Make Me Feel (Mighty Real)" in 1997. Like Sylvester's original recording, Stingily's cover version of "You Make Me Feel (Mighty Real)" (produced by UK music producer Damien Mendis) also went to number-one on the American dance chart, where it spent one week atop the chart in March 1998. Although there have been instances where the same song, recorded by two different artists, has reached #1 on the Billboard Hot Dance Club Play chart ("Don't Leave Me This Way" is one example), it is still a fairly rare occurrence. This version also reached number 13 in the UK and number 25 in Italy. In 1998, it was featured on Stingily's debut album, The Purist.

Critical reception
Larry Flick from Billboard wrote that Stingily "bravely takes on Sylvester's disco classic and infuses a startling combination of pulpit-pounding preaching and hip-grinding sexuality." He noted that "his falsetto has never sounded so limber and soulful, and the track percolates with equal parts retro reverence and modern flair. Stingily has recently burst into pop prominence in the U.K. and Europe with this winning effort. What a treat it would be to see him enjoy comparable success in his home territory." Pan-European magazine Music & Media said that the cover "stays close to the original (sampled here), but doesn't sound at all dated." A reviewer from Vibe noted that "it's deliciously ironic that the defining moment in Byron Stingily's solo debut, The Purist, occurs during the climax of Sylvester's evergreen "You Make Me Feel (Mighty Real)"." The magazine added that Stingily "whips through a vamp that eerily duplicates the late disco belter's primal intensity."

Charts

Other notable versions
In 1991, actress-comedian Sandra Bernhard recorded her own version of the single, which is a tribute to James, on her album Excuses for Bad Behavior (Part One). A series of 12" remix singles was released in 1994 by Epic Records' 550 Music imprint, who also signed Bernhard and picked up her album for a major push that same year. It peaked at #13 on the Billboard Hot Dance Club Play chart, and #86 on the UK Singles Chart in late 1994.

Appearances in other media
The song was used for Danny DeVito's character's strip dance routine in the Friends Season 10 episode "The One Where The Stripper Cries".
The song was featured in a 2017 Candy Crush commercial. Beginning in June 2021, it was also used in an advertisement for the Paco Rabanne cologne PHANTOM.
The song is featured on the 2021 dance rhythm game, Just Dance 2022.
The song was used during a "Lip Sync for Your Life" in the 8th season of RuPaul's Drag Race.
The song was used as the closing theme of the 1983 pilot for the 1984 NBC game show, Hot Potato.

References

External links
 http://articles.latimes.com/1988-09-10/entertainment/ca-1571_1_aids-cases
"Dance (Disco Heat)" / "You Make Me Feel (Mighty Real)" 12" single info Discogs.com.

1978 songs
1978 singles
Sylvester (singer) songs
Jimmy Somerville songs
1989 singles
1994 singles
1998 singles
LGBT-related songs
Number-one singles in Israel
Song recordings produced by Harvey Fuqua
Fantasy Records singles
United States National Recording Registry recordings